Ilan I. Berman (born December 23, 1975) is an American lawyer and educator. He is the Vice President of the American Foreign Policy Council, a non-profit  U.S. foreign policy think tank in Washington, DC.  He focuses on regional security in the Middle East, Central Asia, and the Russian Federation.

Education
Berman has a BA in Politics from Brandeis University, an MA in International Politics from American University, and a JD from Washington College of Law.

Career
Berman is adjunct professor for International Law and Global Security at the National Defense University, and a member of the Associated Faculty at Missouri State University's Department of Defense and Strategic Studies.  He also serves as a member of the Committee on the Present Danger, writes a monthly column for Forbes.com, and is an Editor of The Journal of International Security Affairs.  He has also advised the United States Department of Defense, agencies of the U.S. government including the CIA, and offices of congressmen on matters of foreign policy and national security.

Views
In November 2002, Al Ahram Weekly quoted him as remarking with regard to the U.S.'s targeted killing of al-Qaeda terrorists in Yemen,

It is too early to tell whether this event alone will precipitate a shift toward explicit support of such tactics as employed by Israel on Washington's part.  What does seem clear, however, is that the United States and Israel are gravitating toward increasingly similar perceptions, and possibly strategies, in the war on terrorism.

He wrote in his 2005 book Tehran Rising: Iran's Challenge to the United States and has said in speeches that in displacing Saddam Hussein's government in Iraq which had been an enemy of Iran, and the Taliban in Afghanistan which had been a rival, the United States had unintentionally taken away two significant checks on the power of Iran in the Middle East.

In August 2006 he noted that to that point in time, the U.S. had had a lot of difficulty in convincing especially Russia and China, to support sanctions on Iran for its moving forward with its uranium enrichment program, and that "both Moscow and Beijing are major strategic partners of the Islamic republic and have a vested interest in protecting their investments in the Iranian regime."  In July 2008 he observed: ""The Iranians are playing a colossal game of chicken with us," and asked: "Does the international community have the will to take the short-term pain and disarm these guys, or accept the long-term pain of a region completely dominated by this regime? I think the world community has essentially come to grips with the fact that Iran is going to go nuclear."

In October 2009, Berman noted:  "The Iranian strategy has been pretty consistent all along; to keep the West talking while they work on their nuclear program."  In March 2010, commenting on Iran's warning to Europe not to sanction it, he observed:

The Iranians have a pattern of warning anyone threatening to get tough with them, basically saying, 'Don't do this, because there will be consequences.  What's notable here is that they are singling out Europe.  It's a sure sign Europe is being more activist [about curtailing economic ties to Iran] than it normally is."

Lou Dobbs of CNN in 2008 described him as "one of the [U.S.]'s leading experts on the Middle East and Iran."

Works

Books
Winning the Long War: Retaking the Offensive Against Radical Islam, (Rowman & Littlefield, 2009)
Tehran Rising: Iran's Challenge to the United States (Rowman & Littlefield, 2005)
Dismantling Tyranny: Transitioning Beyond Totalitarian Regimes, co-editor, with J. Michael Waller (Rowman & Littlefield, 2005)
Taking on Tehran: Strategies for Confronting the Islamic Republic, editor (Rowman & Littlefield, 2007)

Select articles
"To Stop Iran, Lean On China", The New York Times, Op-Ed, November 8, 2011
"The Islamist Flirtation; Mohamed ElBaradei's growing ties to the Egyptian Muslim Brotherhood call into question his commitment to liberal reform", Foreign Policy, April 2, 2010
"Our Missile-Defense Race Against Iran; The Bush-era plan was the best of the realistic alternatives", The Wall Street Journal, September 21, 2009
"How to Engage Iran (If You Must); Tehran has mastered the dark arts of deception and delay. Here’s how Obama can cut through the diplomatic fog and get results", Foreign Policy, September 8, 2009
"Review of Iran and the Bomb", Middle East Quarterly, 2009
"Chill wind blows over claims to Arctic lands", Jane's Defence Weekly, 2008
"Toward an Economic Strategy against Iran", Comparative Strategy, 2008
"The Iranian Nuclear Crisis: Latest Developments and Next Steps", AFP Council, 2007
"The Logic Behind Sino-Iranian Cooperation", The China and Eurasia Forum Quarterly, 2006
"The Bear Is Back. Russia's Middle Eastern adventures", National Review Online, February 18, 2005
"The new battleground: Central Asia and the Caucasus", The Washington Quarterly, 2004
"Israel, India, and Turkey: Triple Entente?", Middle East Quarterly, 2002

Statement before Congress
"The Economics of Confronting Iran", Statement Before the Joint Economic Committee of the United States Congress, July 25, 2006

References

External links
American Foreign Policy Council bio
College of International Security Affairs bio
The American Spectator bio

Living people
Brandeis University alumni
American University School of International Service alumni
Washington College of Law alumni
American foreign policy writers
American male non-fiction writers
American political scientists
Missouri State University faculty
National Defense University faculty
1975 births